Katano is a city in Osaka, Japan.

Katano may also refer to:

 Hiromichi Katano (born 1982), Japanese football player
 Koki Katano (born 1968), Japanese tenor
 Katano Station, a Kitakyushu monorail station in Kitakyushu, Japan

See also
 Katana (disambiguation)